Elena Kunova (born November 5, 1975), is a Bulgarian volleyball player.

She participated at the 2002 FIVB Volleyball Women's World Championship in Germany. As of 2002, she plays for Vilsbiburg RR.

References

External links 

Living people
Bulgarian women's volleyball players
1975 births
Middle blockers